Menina may refer to:

 "Menina do alto da serra", the Portuguese entry in the Eurovision Song Contest 1971
 Menina Izildinha (1897–1911), a popular saint in Brazilian Catholicism
 Hamza Ménina (born 1981), Algerian triple jumper
 Menina, Thesprotia, a village in Greece

See also
 Battle of Menina, fought in Menina, Greece in 1944, during the German occupation of Greece
 Menina Pasture Plateau, a plateau in Slovenia
 Las Meninas (disambiguation)